Pyrausta rubescentalis is a moth in the family Crambidae. It is found in South America.

References

Moths described in 1913
rubescentalis
Moths of South America